Leutnant Franz Brandt (13 February 1893 – 1954) was a German World War I flying ace credited with ten confirmed aerial victories, as well as three unconfirmed claims.

Early life

Franz Brandt was born on 13 February 1893 in Minden.

World War I service

Brandt entered the war an artilleryman. In July 1915 he transferred to aviation. His first assignment after training was Kampfstaffel (Tactical Bomber Squadron) 14, between July and September 1916. In December, he moved on to Schutzstaffel (Protection Squadron) 2; he saw some action there, but no results yet. On 2 February 1917, he was reassigned, to Jagdstaffel 19. There he flew an Albatros D.II. He scored his first victory on 4 May, downing a Spad VII. On 21 August 1917, he took out an enemy observation balloon for his second triumph. On 31 December 1917, he changed squadrons again, to Jagdstaffel 27. In his tenure there, he downed enemy fighter planes on 23 January, 7 April, and 17 June 1918. On 27 June 1918, he was appointed to command of Jagdstaffel 26. Between 7 July and 22 September, he shot down four enemy fighters and a two-seater. Brandt ended the war still commanding Jagdstaffel 26.

Decorations and awards
 Royal Order of the House of Hohenzollern
 Iron Cross of 1914, 1st and 2nd class

Sources of information

References
 Above the Lines: The Aces and Fighter Units of the German Air Service, Naval Air Service and Flanders Marine Corps 1914 - 1918 Norman L. R. Franks, et al. Grub Street, 1993. , .

1893 births
1954 deaths
German World War I flying aces
People from Minden
People from the Province of Westphalia
Recipients of the Iron Cross (1914), 1st class
Military personnel from North Rhine-Westphalia